Ilinden is a municipality part of North Macedonia. Ilinden is also the name of the town where the municipal seat is found. It is named after the Ilinden Uprising in the region of Macedonia in 1903. It is located in the Skopje Statistical Region.

Geography
The municipality borders Aračinovo Municipality to the north, Petrovec Municipality to the south, the City of Skopje: (Gazi Baba Municipality) to the west, and Kumanovo Municipality to the east.

Demographics

The total population of the municipality in 2021 is 17,435. At the census in 1994 it had 14,512 inhabitants.

Ethnic groups in the municipality:

References

External links
 Official website

 
Skopje Statistical Region
Municipalities of North Macedonia